Jonathan Estabrooks (born 1983) is a Canadian baritone, record producer, filmmaker and graduate of the Juilliard School. He is active in the Canadian and American Opera, Concert and Musical Theatre worlds and on YouTube. He was executive producer and creator of Artists for the Arts, a charity single and music video in support of Americans for the Arts in their efforts to save the National Endowment for the Arts

Music career
Born in Ottawa, Ontario, Canada, Estabrooks began his musical training as a member of the Opera Lyra Ottawa Boys Choir and Opera Lyra Chorus. He first sang with orchestra in 1994 as the Shepherd Boy in Tosca by Puccini. In 1993 he joined the Company of Musical Theatre, appearing is such productions as Annie, Oliver! as 'Oliver Twist', the Will Rogers Follies and West Side Story.

In October 1999, he sang as part of a vocal quartet for the opening of a new US Embassy in Ottawa, Ontario, Canada for then President Bill Clinton, and Prime Minister of Canada, Jean Chrétien.

He earned his Bachelor of Music degree from the University of Toronto in 2006 and his Masters of Music degree from the Juilliard School in 2009, where he was a student of Marlena Malas. He is a graduate of Ashbury College. He has also coached with Brian Zeger, Joan Dornemann, Craig Rutenberg, Margo Garrett, Nico Castel, Joan Dornemann and Denise Masse.

Estabrooks sang with the Juilliard Orchestra for the New York Premiere of Siarra a work for baritone and orchestra as part of the 2009 Juilliard Focus Festival. Estabrooks was a finalist in the 2007 Bryan Law Opera Competition and the 2009 Lyndon Woodside Solo Competition performed at Carnegie Hall.

He made his National Arts Centre Orchestra debut in 2007, with Pinchas Zukerman conducting and his National Arts Centre recital debut in 2009.

Estabrooks was the baritone soloist in Brahms' Eine Deutsches Requiem with Coro Vivo Ottawa in 2008 and has also performed with the Kennett Symphony of Chester County and the Aldeburgh Connection recital series. He was also a 2009 finalist in the Brian Law Opera Scholarship in Ottawa sponsored by the National Capital Opera Society.   He appeared with pianist Joel Harder at the Caramoor Festival, presenting three concerts for the Holiday Musicale series at the Rosen House.

On June 19, 2009 in Ottawa, he made his National Arts Centre Recital debut with soprano Meghan McPhee as participants in the NAC Summer Music Institute. Other recent credits include performances with the Israeli Chamber Orchestra, and a 20-city tour in L’Elisir d’Amore with Jeunesses Musicales.  In April, at New York's Weill Recital Hall, Estabrooks won the top prize in a competition presented by the Oratorio Society of New York.

Estabrooks made his Opera Lyra Ottawa main-stage debut in the role of Silvio in September 2011 at the National Arts Centre. He debuted with the Greenwich Choral Society singing the baritone solo for In Terra Pax and a world premiere by composer  Rob Mathes.

He made his Toronto Symphony Orchestra debut on October 9 and 10, 2012 with conductor Steven Reineke in a program entitled "Some Enchanted Evening: The Music of Rodgers & Hammerstein" with Broadway stars Ashley Brown and Aaron Lazar. He returned to Roy Thomson Hall with the Toronto Symphony Orchestra on May 20 and 21, 2014 to perform in Classical Broadway: Lerner and Loewe.

On March 5, 2013, Estabrooks made his Carnegie Hall-Stern Auditorium Debut with conductor Kent Tritle and the Oratorio Society of New York in the New York premiere of Paul Moravec's 'Blizzard Voices'.

He appeared as the Baron in the Opera Lyra Ottawa production of La Traviata on March 21 and 23, 2013 with the National Arts Centre Orchestra alongside Corrine Winters, Eric Magiore, Marion Newman, Gregory Dahl and conductor Tyrone Paterson.

On July 15, 2013, Estabrooks successfully raised US$25,730 on the funding website Kickstarter for the recording of his debut album with orchestra.  Entitled "These Miles" it was released on April 8, 2014 fusing elements of classical, pop and classic musical theatre with the lushness of the Macedonia Radio Orchestra. Collaborations include tenor Jonathan Antoine, formerly of the duo Jonathan and Charlotte and New Age classical pianist and composer Jennifer Thomas (pianist). It was produced by Dave Reitzas, Oran Eldor and himself and was recorded with the help of over 50 musicians from around the world.

On November 21 & 22, 2014, Estabrooks made his Vancouver Symphony Orchestra debut in a program of Lerner and Loewe alongside Steven Reineke, tenor David Curry, and soprano Amy Wallis.

In March 2015 he made his Seattle Symphony debut with conductor Steven Reineke in a program entitled "Some Enchanted Evening: A Rodgers & Hammerstein Celebration" with Broadway stars Ashley Brown and Aaron Lazar.

On September 24, 2015, with only 2-weeks notice, he stepped in for an ailing baritone to play the lead role of Bum Phillips in Bum Phillips All American Opera, telling the story of the head coach of the Houston Oilers. The performance marked the opera's Houston premiere at the  Stafford Township Arts Center and a benefit for the Dan Pastorini charity.

On March 7, 2017, executive producer Estabrooks, producer Michael J. Moritz Jr., Broadway orchestrator Charlie Rosen, and producer Van Dean of Broadway Records  helped gather a galaxy of stars at Avatar Studios in New York and Los Angeles  gathered a galaxy of voices and performers for an all-star single and video to benefit Americans For The Arts. Their gospel-tinged cover of The Beatles' "With a Little Help From My Friends" was released on March 23, 2017, just a week after the National Endowment for the Arts and other arts organizations came under fire in President Trump's proposed budget. Participating artists included television star Annie Golden, Chris Mann and Peter Hollens; Broadway stars Telly Leung, Lexi Lawson, Liz Callaway, Ektor Rivera, Bryan Terrell Clark (Hamilton), Lillias White (Fela!, The Life), Aaron Lazar (The Last Ship, The Light In the Piazza), Ashley Brown, Carmen Cusack, Cass Dillon, Lauren Jelencovich (Yanni Vocalist), Noah Stewart; spoken word artists Taylor Mali, Trace DePass, Shanelle Gabriel; cabaret stars Natalie Douglas and KT Sullivan, and a pop chorus of 50 accompanied by full orchestra.

100% of net proceeds from the single went to support Americans For The Arts and their efforts in Arts Advocacy, funding and education in order to protect the National Endowment for the Arts.

In October 2019, Estabrooks created the role of Mat Burke in the world premiere production of Anna Christie, a new music drama based on the Eugene O'Neill play. It was composed by Edward Thomas with libretto by Joseph Masteroff and was be produced by Encompass New Opera Theatre at Baruch College Performing Arts Centre. A recording with the original cast, produced by Thomas Z. Shepard and conducted by Julian Wachner, with the orchestra NOVUS New York, was released by Broadway Records on August 16, 2019. It was a collaboration of Trinity Church and Encompass New Opera Theatre and debuted at #6 on the Billboard classical album chart.

Mr. Estabrooks is currently directing and co-producing BLACK OPERA, A documentary film celebrating the breakout careers of the first generation of African-American opera superstars and the future of Opera. It will feature stars past and present including Leontyne Price, Simon Estes, Grace Bumbry, Martina Arroyo, George Shirley and Jessye Norman.

In July 2021, Jonathan joined Emitha LLC as producer and Vice president of Production managing media projects in music and film including full album production (sound mixing/mastering) and visual media (DP/Director). Mr. Estabrooks works with both Crossover Records and Lexicon Classics, two record labels owned by Emitha LLC. To date he has produced and/or mixed over 20 projects in the classical and crossover genres. 

LAMENT produced by Mr. Estabrooks for Grammy® nominated baritone Sidney Outlaw and Warren Jones reached #2 on the Billboard Traditional Classical chart.

Awards, honors and distinctions
2011: First Place winner, Oratorio Society of New York's Lyndon Woodside Oratorio-Solo Competition.

Discography

These Miles
Independent (CD: April 8, 2014, ASIN: B00IT4YEFQ) 
Play Me — 3:54
Kathy's Song — 3:36
Time After Time — 4:51
Le Cose Che Tu Sei— 4:39
Calling You — 5:12
She — 4:29
Por Una Cabeza — 3:44
Always On My Mind — 3:28
Away From the Roll of the Sea — 4:09
Any Place I Hang My Hat is Home — 4:46
All the Things You Are/Hymne a L'amour — 4:46
Fly Away — 3:36

With A Little Help From My Friends - Single
Broadway Records (Single: March 2017, ASIN: B06XQ7GHYC) 
With A Little Help From My Friends — 4:43

Anna Christie: World Premiere Recording
Broadway Records (CD: August 16, 2019, ASIN: B07TNVX4RT) 

Disc: 1
Act 1, Scene 1: Prelude
Act 1, Scene 1: Inside Larry's Bar, Chris and Larry
Act 1, Scene 1: Marthy Enters
Act 1, Scene 1: Anna Enters
Act 1, Scene 1: Chris Re-Awakens
Act 1, Scene 1: Anna and Chris Meet
Act 1, Scene 1: Orchestral Interlude
Act 1, Scene 2: Anna and Chris on His Barge
Act 1, Scene 2: Orchestral Interlude
Act 1, Scene 2: Mat Enters
Act 1, Scene 2: Anna and Mat Alone
Act 1, Scene 2: Chris Re-Enters

Disc: 2
Act 2, Scene 1: The Cabin on Chris's Barge; Chris and Anna
Act 2, Scene 1: Mat and Chris
Act 2, Scene 1: Anna Enters
Act 2, Scene 1: Orchestral Interlude
Act 2, Scene 2: On the Deck of the Barge, Anna and Chris
Act 2, Scene 2: Mat Returns

References

External links
 

Canadian baritones
Canadian operatic baritones
1983 births
Living people
Musicians from Ottawa
21st-century Canadian male singers